George Crockett Strong (October 16, 1832 – July 30, 1863) was a Union brigadier general in the American Civil War.

Biography
Strong was born in Stockbridge, Vermont, and attended Williston Seminary but left after 1851.  Strong's ancestors all came to from England, and they all arrived in early colonial New England as part of the Puritan migration to New England between 1620 and 1640. He attended Union College, but left for the U.S. Military Academy, from which he graduated in 1857. He served as an ordnance officer with the rank of lieutenant on the staff of General McDowell at the First Battle of Bull Run. He later served on the staffs of Generals George B. McClellan and Benjamin Butler. 

"Cadet Life at West Point by an Officer of the United States Army" (Boston: T.O.H.P. Burnham, 1862), although published anonymously, is attributed to Strong.

Strong commanded an expedition sent from Ship Island against Biloxi, Mississippi, in April 1862, and another sent against Ponchatoula, and was commissioned brigadier general of volunteers in November 1862. He was wounded on July 18, 1863, while leading the assault against Fort Wagner on Morris Island, South Carolina, and died of tetanus in New York City. He posthumously received a commission as major general, dated from the day of the battle.  Strong is buried in Green-Wood Cemetery in Brooklyn, New York, where there is a monument dedicated to his memory.

His name is the first name listed on the monument to those who died during the "Great Rebellion" in Easthampton, Massachusetts. Beneath his name are the names of all the others who died from this town. The memorial claims he graduated 3rd in his class at West Point.

Fort Strong, a U.S. Coast Artillery fort at the northern end of Deer Island in Boston Harbor, was named after him in 1899.

In popular culture
Strong was portrayed by Jay O. Sanders in the film Glory (1989).

See also

List of American Civil War generals (Union)

References

External links
historycentral.com
vermontcivilwar.com

1832 births
1863 deaths
United States Military Academy alumni
Union Army generals
People of Vermont in the American Civil War
Union military personnel killed in the American Civil War
Infectious disease deaths in New York (state)
Deaths from tetanus
Burials at Green-Wood Cemetery
People from Windsor County, Vermont